Sigvard Emil Gundersen (8 November 1842 – 29 November 1904) was a Norwegian actor. He was married to actress Laura Gundersen. He made his stage début at Christiania Theater in 1862, and worked for this theatre most of his career, until 1899.

He served as the first chairman of the Norwegian Actors' Equity Association, from 1898 to 1899.

References

1842 births
1904 deaths
People from Kristiansand
Norwegian male stage actors
19th-century Norwegian male actors